Mount Bintang is a mountain on the border of the states Kedah and Perak in the Bintang Mountains, Malaysia. It is the highest mountain in the state of Kedah.

See also
 List of Ultras of Southeast Asia

References

External links
 "Gunung Bintang, Malaysia" on Peakbagger

Bintang
Titiwangsa Mountains